Opatija is a town and a municipality in Primorje-Gorski Kotar County in western Croatia. The traditional seaside resort on the Kvarner Gulf is known for its Mediterranean climate and its historic buildings reminiscent of the Austrian Riviera.

Geography

The city is geographically on the Istrian peninsula, though not in Istria County.

The town is a popular summer and winter resort, with average high temperatures of 10 °C in winter, and 32 °C in summer. Opatija is surrounded by beautiful woods of bay laurel. The whole sea-coast to the north and south of Opatija is rocky and picturesque, and contains several smaller winter resorts.

History
Opatija was included in the territory of the Liburni, a pre-Roman Illyrian tribe. In Roman times, the area was home to several patrician villas connected to the nearby town of Castrum Laureana, the modern Lovran.

Croats settled in the region from about 700 AD onwards. Conquered by King Pepin of Italy, son of Charlemagne, in 789, the Istrian peninsula up to the Kvarner Gulf was incorporated into the Carolingian March of Friuli by 803. In the east, it bordered on the medieval Kingdom of Croatia established by King Tomislav about 925. Having invaded Italy, King Otto of Germany made the Istrian lands part of the vast March of Verona and Aquileia; from the 11th century onwards, the Imperial estates were held by the Patriarchs of Aquileia.

In the Middle Ages the current town's territory was divided between Veprinac (now a locality of Opatija, perhaps home to a small fishing port) and Kastav, where the fisherman village of Veprinac. The small hamlet of Opatija itself developed around a Benedictine abbey dedicated to Saint Jacob, which was first mentioned in 1453. While western Istria was gradually conquered by the Republic of Venice by 1420, the remaining territory up to Opatija fell to the House of Habsburg and later was incorporated into the Austrian Littoral.

The town's modern history began in 1844, when Iginio Scarpa (1794–1866), a wealthy merchant from Rijeka, had the Villa Angiolina manor built in an extended park, where he received notable guests such as Ban Josip Jelačić. In 1873 the Austrian Southern Railway company from Vienna opened the branch line from Pivka to Rijeka via nearby Matulji and thus opened the path for the development of tourism in Opatija and neighbouring Lovran. In 1882, the railway company purchased the Villa Angiolina, where it accommodated the crown princely couple Rudolf and Stéphanie. At the time, Friedrich Julius Schüler (1832–1894), the Managing Director of the Southern Railways, started the construction of the Hotel Quarnero (Kvarner Hotel) and the Hotel Kronprinzessin Stephanie (present-day Hotel Imperial), and also was responsible for the unique lungomare and parks (the Company engaged Carl Schubert, director of the Viennese Emperial-Royal Society for the construction of parks). The Villa Angiolina was later run by the Compagnie Internationale des Wagons-Lits. In the Angiolina Park today stands Schüler's bust, a work of the sculptor Hans Rathausky.

In 1887, Heinrich von Littrow established the "Union Yacht Club Quarnero" in Opatija (founded in June/July 1886); this was the first sailing club on the Adriatic coast. In 1889 the Cisleithanian government officially declared Abbazia (Opatija) the first climatic seaside resort (Seebad) on the Austrian Riviera, rivalled by Brioni, Duino, Grado, and Portorož. After the hotels, the building of villas started, for the needs of more demanding noble guests. The first Villa Amalia, in the immediate vicinity of the Hotel Quarnero, was built in 1890 as the hotel's annex. Opatija's first guide was published in 1883 in Vienna with the title Abbazia, Idylle von der Adria. The same year saw the publication of Abbazia und seine Umgebung (Opatija and its Environs) by Heinrich Noe, who in 1884 published his Tagebuch aus Abbazia (Diary from Opatija). Joseph Rable printed Curort und Seebad Abbazia (Spa and the bathing beach in Opatija), and Peter von Radics wrote a guidebook simply titled  Abbazia. 

In 1908 a tramway line was opened, running from Matulji station along the coast via Opatija down to Lovran in the south. Opatija is best known nowadays as the venue for a 1912 chess tournament devoted to the King’s Gambit. The Austrian emperor Franz Joseph I used to spend several months there during the winter. He met there with the German emperor Wilhelm II on 29 March 1894; other crowned heads seeking relaxation included Empress Elisabeth of Austria and the German empress Augusta Victoria, King Carol I of Romania and his consort Elisabeth, King George I of Greece, King Albert of Saxony, Grand Duke William IV of Luxembourg, and Prince Nikola I Petrović-Njegoš. Many of the late 19th-century luxury hotels and villas have survived to present times.

During World War I the Hotel Icicii was converted to a military hospital. The accompanying pictures show the nursing staff and wounded at lunch, on the grounds, and receiving care.  In 1920 Opatija was assigned to Italy. The upper floor of Villa Amalia was built in 1930, and the building was renovated to become the summer residence of the House of Savoy.

In 1947 Opatija was given to Yugoslavia as part of the peace treaty with Italy; most of the Italian-speaking population emigrated to Italy. In 1963 the Hotel Adriatic, by the architect Andrija Čičin-Šain and his team was completed. Hotel "Adriatic" was the first hotel built in Opatija after the Austro-Hungarian era. The rooms of hotel "Adriatic" have been described as novelties in the hospitality industry. The "Casino Rosalia" was opened in Opatija – the first casino in Eastern Europe. In 1981 the Hotel "Admiral" and marina (200 berths and 40 dry berths) were completed. 
After the breakup of Yugoslavia which began in 1991, the town became part of Croatia.

Population

Landmarks
The 14th-century Benedictine abbey, Opatija Sv. Jakova ("Abbey of Saint Jacob"), from which the town derives its name (opatija means "abbey" in Croatian) is located in Park Svetog Jakova or Saint Jacob's Park. Saint Jacob's church, built in 1506 and enlarged in 1937, now stands on the same spot. The neo-Romanesque Church of the Annunciation with its pronounced green cupola, was designed in 1906 by architect Karl Seidl.

Another sight is the Villa Angiolina, built in 1844 by Iginio Scarpa. This villa, transformed into a museum. Since 1844. Villa Angiolina had many prominent guests

Opatija is known for the Maiden with the seagull, a statue by Zvonko Car (1956), which is positioned on a promontory by the Juraj Šporer art pavilion. It has turned into one of symbols of Opatija. A gilded variant of the statue Madonna, that once stood here but was demolished by communists after the end of World War II, now stands in front of Saint Jacob's Church.

The town park Angiolina contains many species of plants from all over the world. It has been protected since 1968. Close-by, vis-a-vis Hotel Imperial, stands the statue The Fountain - Helios and Selena, a work of the Austrian sculptor Hans Rathautsky from 1889. There is a 12 km-long promenade along the entire riviera, the Lungomare from Volosko, via Opatija, to Lovran and a 7 km-long forest path walk, the Šetalište Carmen Sylve, named after Elisabeth of Wied, Queen consort of Romania, widely known by her literary name of Carmen Sylva.

Film location 
Several scenes of "The Legacy Run"  have been shot in Opatija. The movie, in good part shot in the Opatija-Rijeka region, is the conceptual prequel of the international TV Series "Sport Crime".

Notable people 
 Theodor Billroth (1829–1894), died in Opatija
 Robert Gerle (1924–2005), born in Opatija
 Drago Gervais (1904–1957), born in Opatija
 Kosta Hakman (1899–1961), died in Opatija
 Franz Graf von Meran (1839–1891), died in Opatija
 Frank Horvat (1928-2020), born in Opatija
 Andrija Mohorovičić (1857–1936), born in Opatija
 Leo Sternbach (1908–2005), born in Opatija
 Gyula Szapáry (1832–1905), died in Opatija

Gallery

Twin towns—Sister cities 

Opatija is twinned with:
  Castel San Pietro Terme, Italy
  Ilirska Bistrica, Slovenia
  Balatonfüred, Hungary
  Carmagnola, Italy
  Bad Ischl, Austria
  Ferrara, Italy

See also 
 Opatija Circuit

Notes

References

External links

 Official website
 Opatija LIVE WebCams
 Opatija Weather Station - Current Weather Conditions at Opatija

Cities and towns in Croatia
Istria
Populated coastal places in Croatia
Populated places in Primorje-Gorski Kotar County
Seaside resorts in Croatia